Steve Whyte in an Australian professional footballer who plays for Melbourne Knights in the National Premier Leagues Victoria.

Whyte played youth football for Central Coast Mariners, before moving overseas to Seattle in 2017, where he made his professional debut.

In 2018 Whyte returned to Australia to link up with his former Central Coast Mariners coach Ben Cahn at Olympic FC.

Playing career
Whyte signed with Seattle Sounders FC 2 in the United Soccer League in August 2017, having linked with the club through former Mariner and now S2 assistant coach John Hutchinson.

References

External links
 

1996 births
Living people
Australian soccer players
Central Coast Mariners Academy players
Central Coast Mariners FC players
Tacoma Defiance players
USL Championship players
Australian expatriate soccer players
Expatriate soccer players in the United States
Australian expatriate sportspeople in the United States
Association football midfielders